Armando Said Flores Hernandez (born 16 June 2006) is a Mexican actor .

Biography 
In 2015 he studied in Centro de Educación Artística of Televisa.

participed in movie "Por mis bigotes" as Marcelino.
After he participed in series Como dice el dicho, La Rosa de Guadalupe and ZeroZeroZero

In 2021 interpreted as Pablo Lopez of Netflix Guerra de Vecinos with Vanessa Bauche, Ana Layevska, Mark Tacher, Elyfer Torres, Christian Vázquez (actor), Loreto Peralta and Marco López

Filmography

References

External links 

 
 
 

Living people
2006 births
Male actors from Mexico City
Mexican male film actors
Mexican male telenovela actors